John Jacob Rawl House is a historic home located at Batesburg-Leesville, Lexington County, South Carolina. It was built about 1900, and is a one-story frame Victorian dwelling with elaborate carpenter's ornamentation. It has a brick pier foundation and a standing seam metal gable roof.  The façade features a porch with rounded corners and an elaborate spindle frieze.

It was listed on the National Register of Historic Places in 1982.

References 

Houses on the National Register of Historic Places in South Carolina
Victorian architecture in South Carolina
Houses completed in 1900
Houses in Lexington County, South Carolina
National Register of Historic Places in Lexington County, South Carolina